Snowpiercer is an American post-apocalyptic dystopian thriller television series that premiered on TNT on May 17, 2020. It is based on both the 2013 film of the same name, directed by Bong Joon-ho and the 1982 French graphic novel Le Transperceneige by Jacques Lob, Benjamin Legrand and Jean-Marc Rochette, from which the film was adapted.

The series, a reboot of the film's continuity, follows the passengers of the Snowpiercer, a gigantic, perpetually moving train that circles the globe carrying the remnants of humanity seven years after the world becomes a frozen wasteland. The series questions class warfare, social injustice and the politics of survival. Jennifer Connelly and Daveed Diggs star alongside Mickey Sumner, Alison Wright, Iddo Goldberg, Susan Park, Katie McGuinness, Sam Otto, Sheila Vand, Mike O'Malley, Annalise Basso, Jaylin Fletcher, Lena Hall and Roberto Urbina. Steven Ogg, Rowan Blanchard and Sean Bean joined the main cast in the second season and both Chelsea Harris and Archie Panjabi joined the main cast in the third season.

While in development at TNT for over three years, the series faced numerous production issues and delays arising from creative differences between the series' producers and the network. The series remained in development hell until May 2019, when it was announced that the series would instead air on TNT's sister network TBS for a release in the second quarter of 2020 and that it had already been renewed for a second season. However, in September 2019, the decision to change networks was reversed.

Prior to studio shutdowns that occurred due to the outbreak of the COVID-19 pandemic in the United States, most of the second season's production was completed. The second season premiered on January 25, 2021. In January 2021, ahead of the second-season premiere, the series was renewed for a third season which premiered on January 24, 2022. In July 2021, ahead of the third-season premiere, the series was renewed for a fourth season. In June 2022, ahead of the fourth season premiere, it was announced that the fourth season would be its last, being intended to make it the final scripted original series to air on TNT before the production of original programming was ceased. In January 2023, it was announced that the fourth season would not air on TNT at all and was in the process of moving elsewhere.

Premise
Snowpiercer is set in 2026, seven years after the world becomes a frozen wasteland, and follows the remnants of humanity who have taken shelter on a perpetually moving luxury train. Designed and built by the eccentric billionaire Mr. Wilford, the train consists of 1,001 carriages and circles the globe 2.7 times per year. The constant motion of the train provides energy and prevents the passengers from freezing as well. Since the catastrophe, the train's population has become rigidly separated by class, caught up in a revolutionary struggle against the strictly imposed social hierarchy and unbalanced allocation of limited resources. The show explores issues of class warfare, social injustice, and the politics of survival.

Cast and characters

Main

 Jennifer Connelly as Melanie Cavill: The powerful Head of Hospitality (the department responsible for smooth relations) and the Voice of the Train (responsible for making the PA system's daily announcements) aboard Snowpiercer. Though many of her peers are dismissive of the lower-class passengers, Melanie is curiously fascinated by them as she came from humble beginnings, explaining much of her sympathies. To the majority of the train, Melanie is believed to be Mr. Wilford's representative in relaying orders to the passengers and crew. It is later revealed Melanie has assumed his identity and is actually Snowpiercer Head Engineer, working tirelessly to keep it functional. Melanie has been facing the crushing burden of directing Snowpiercer on its global journey, managing mounting resource and class issues, having her authority and decisions challenged and maintaining Wilford's iron order throughout the train to preserve the last of humanity. With few aware of her true identity, she is also desperate to maintain the myth of Wilford and keep her identity secret. Ultimately the secret is exposed, leading to a coup attempt by wealthy passengers from First Class, and a revolution by the Tail and Third Class sections with Melanie siding with Layton in the end. After the revolution, Melanie officially hands leadership of the train to Layton and resumes her duties as Head Engineer, but her plans to remain indefinitely in the engine room are threatened by the arrival of Mr. Wilford, and the surprise return of Melanie's believed-dead daughter Alexandra. In the second season, Melanie departs Snowpiercer to find a place that humanity can recolonize. In the second season finale, Layton and Alex discover that Melanie had sacrificed the last of her power to protect her data before seemingly walking into the Freeze to die, having ensured that humanity would have a future. In season three, Melanie appears as a hallucination to both Alex and Wilford. It's eventually discovered that she had actually survived by taking a track scaler from a nearby hanger and using the suspension drug to keep herself in hibernation. After being rescued, Melanie betrays Layton and seizes control of the Engine before agreeing to split the train with Melanie leading those who want to stay onboard Snowpiercer.
 Daveed Diggs as Andre Layton: A former detective, is a quiet thinker who spends his days tending to his cage of rats in the Tail, and a dangerous rebel who helps coordinate and lead a revolution against the oppressive First Class to improve the harsh living conditions in the tail end of the train. As he is the world's only surviving homicide detective, he is reluctantly deputized by Melanie as Snowpiercer Train Detective, to help solve a series of murders; involving him and those he cares about in a struggle that could upend life on the train. Layton uses his new position as train detective to investigate the killings, while gathering intelligence and support for the revolution, and uses what he learns to start a revolution by the Tail and Third Class sections. After a bloody conflict, Layton's revolution succeeds and he is officially handed leadership of the train by Melanie. Originally planning to implement a new democratic government, his plans are threatened by the arrival of Mr. Wilford. While at times Layton and Melanie have been enemies, only by putting aside their differences and working together did they save Snowpiercer and overthrow the system. At the end of the second season, Layton creates his own pirate train out of the first ten cars of Snowpiercer in order to resist Wilford, taking with him several of his and Melanie's most trusted loyalists. At the end of the third season, Layton takes Big Alice and a number of people to a habitable valley in the Horn of Africa.
 Mickey Sumner as Bess Till: A thoughtful, empathetic, and savvy Brakeman who is part of the train's security force, she is a former Detroit PD first-year rookie officer who witnessed the department's self-destruction during the Freeze. She finds herself at the center of a series of murders that rocks the train's uneasy status quo. She is in a serious romantic relationship with Jinju, and later upgrades to Second Class to be with her. Tormented by witnessing the injustices of the class system, she ultimately breaks from the Brakemen and decides to support Layton's revolution, which cost her her relationship with Jinju. As a result, she becomes one of Layton's most trusted friends and allies. In season 2, Layton promotes her to Train Detective and Till struggles with her actions and her place in the world now. She joins Layton's pirate train at the end of the season. After the trains reconnect in season 3, Till resumes her role as Train Detective, investigating Pike's attempts to assassinate Layton and forming a romantic relationship with Miss Audrey. After Big Alice separated from Snowpiercer to embark on its journey to New Eden, Bess became the new Lead Brakemen aboard Snowpiercer. 
 Alison Wright as Ruth Wardell: Melanie's deputy in Hospitality who helps look after First Class passengers, and oversees removal requests from the Tail, or delivering demands to them, activities she seems to feel are beneath her. Before the Freeze, she ran a bed and breakfast in Kendal, and was personally recruited for Snowpiercer by Mr. Wilford when he was a guest. Initially a friend to Melanie, she feels betrayed due to the recent revelations of the secrets Melanie was hiding from her and the rest of the train. After the revolution, Ruth is now Head of Hospitality, and is initially thrilled by Mr. Wilford's return, but begins to wonder whether Layton or Wilford is really the best thing for the train. When questioned by Layton, Ruth insists that her loyalty is to Snowpiercer and the passengers and Melanie believes that Ruth can be trusted as long as Layton remains honest with her. She subsequently acts as part of Layton's leadership council with Miss Audrey, Roche and Bennett Knox but he continues to be reluctant to trust her. After seeing Wilford's cruelty for herself, Ruth sides completely with Layton, but is inadvertently left behind with Wilford when Layton creates a separate pirate train. In season 3, becomes the leader of the resistance against Wilford on Snowpiercer in Layton's absence before resuming her duties as the Head of Hospitality. She later chooses to join Layton in going to New Eden.
 Lena Hall as Miss Audrey: The lead madam of Snowpiercer Nightcar; a Third Class den of (mostly) platonic prostitution and spiritual healing, she is a cunning chanteuse who knows the darkest secrets of the train. She represents Third Class before the rest of the train and is very vocal about the cruelty of the social differences aboard Snowpiercer, and pursues opportunities to demand more social conscience in the train, including supporting Layton's revolution. In season 2, she struggles with the return of Mr. Wilford and appears to be descending into alcoholism. She reveals to Layton that she was once an escort who served Wilford personally for years and has struggled to put her past behind her. In turn, Wilford is shown to have a genuine affection for her. Its revealed that the two have a sadomasochistic relationship with Miss Audrey being the dominant party. She later defects to Wilford's side, helping him against Snowpiercer. When Layton creates a separate pirate train, she is taken hostage by Layton's crew in order to ensure Zarah's safety. After the trains are reconnected, she is exiled to Third Class and banned from the Nightcar. Audrey eventually forms a romantic relationship with Bess Till who helps her to move past Wilford and begin helping people again.
 Iddo Goldberg as Bennett Knox: One of Snowpiercer engineers, who is inside the knowledge of Melanie's impersonation of Mr. Wilford, he is one of Snowpiercer original designers, making him one of the few passengers who knows the deepest secrets of the train. He is fiercely loyal to Melanie, with whom he is romantically involved. When Mr. Wilford returns, he betrays Melanie as he believes that Snowpiercer won't survive without the supplies onboard Big Alice, but he otherwise remains loyal to Snowpiercer and Melanie, forging an alliance with Layton to protect the train together in Melanie's absence. He subsequently acts as part of Layton's leadership council with Miss Audrey, Roche and Ruth Wardell. It's revealed that Bennett was in on the plot to steal the train in the first place unlike his best friend Javi. At the end of the second season, he joins Layton's pirate train as one of Layton's engineers. At the end of season three, Bennett chooses to remain on Snowpiercer with Melanie rather than going to New Eden.
 Susan Park as Jinju Seong (season 1): Snowpiercer agricultural officer who lives in Second Class, she is also the finest chef at the train's finest restaurant, and a member of the train's elite. She was in a serious romantic relationship with Bess, and is inside the knowledge of Melanie's impersonation of Mr. Wilford. After the revolution, she and Bess break up over their differing opinions on the matter and she hasn't been seen since, leaving her ultimate fate unknown.
 Katie McGuinness as Josie Wellstead: A strong, no-nonsense Tailie, she cares for Miles and other children in the tail, and uses training from her time as a veterinarian before the Freeze to treat the sick or injured. She is Andre's love interest after Zarah's departure from the tail. She has been part of uprisings in the tail, and takes great risks on the behalf of her community. She is later thought to have been frozen to death, after trying to kill Melanie who tortured her. In the second season, it's revealed that she actually survived, albeit severely injured. Receiving treatment from the Headwoods on Big Alice, Josie develops a cold resistance that is similar to Icy Bob and receives a new prosthetic hand. She joins the crew of Layton's pirate train at the end of the second season. In the third season, Josie has a brief fling with Bennett Knox before resuming her relationship with Layton with the support of Zarah.
 Sam Otto as John "Oz" Osweiller: A young Brakeman and Bess' partner as a police-type figure of the train. He is more harsh and direct than Bess in dealing with passengers; however, his behavior could be from emotional trauma. He referenced being in pain from "everything", which is his excuse for taking the street-drug Kronole. He was a British football player before the Freeze, raised by a single mother who was a prostitute and emotionally distant from him. In the revolution, Oz abandons his job with the Brakemen, and is now surviving in Third Class with LJ, both of them hated by the train's passengers. Oz starts dating LJ and becomes the head of janitorial after Terence's assassination. In season 3, he and LJ run the Night Car together instead and continue their relationship. In "The Last to Go," the two get married. In "The Original Sinners," Oz leaves LJ to join Big Alice and the colonizing of New Eden.
 Sheila Vand as Zarah Fahrami: Andre's ex-wife who, unable to adjust to the rigors of surviving in poverty on the train, left the Tail to become a bartender in the Nightcar, to the fury of other Tailies and Andre's heartbreak. With Andre's recruitment as Train Detective, she is now forced to confront her past. She is later revealed to be pregnant with Layton's child, and after the revolution is trying to build a new life and a second chance with Andre. In the second season, she joins Hospitality in an effort to contribute and to bridge the gap between Layton and Ruth Wardell. When Layton creates a separate pirate train, Zarah decides to remain behind, feeling that she is safer there and that Wilford doesn't dare to hurt her due to her pregnancy. In season three, it's revealed that she gives birth to Liana Layton whom she allowed Wilford to experiment upon and give a cold immunity to. Zarah later encourages Layton and Josie to pursue a relationship, recognizing that she and Layton are better off as co-parents rather than a couple.
 Roberto Urbina as Javier "Javi" de la Torre: One of Snowpiercer engineers, who is in the know about Melanie's impersonation of Mr. Wilford, but he often questions the morality of Melanie's decisions. He often helps with the driving of the train, and uses advanced algorithms and old hacked satellites remaining in Earth's orbit to predict the environment surrounding Snowpiercer at all times. When the revolution happens, Javi sides with the Folgers at first, but eventually betrays them for their ruthless tactics and rescues Melanie. Following the revolution, he continues working with Bennett and Melanie in the Engine. During the effort to retrieve Melanie, Javi was mauled by Wilford's dog, Jupiter. As revealed in season 3, he survived, but he was left scarred and enslaved to Wilford. Throughout the third season, Javi battles severe PTSD with the help of Sykes and he later joins Layton in going to New Eden.
 Mike O'Malley as Sam Roche: Snowpiercer lead Brakeman who is a former police officer and Wilford's security officer before the Freeze. As the train's chief law enforcement officer, he tried to maintain the train's order, but ended up respecting and allying with Layton, and ultimately decides to support Layton's revolution. He and his wife, Anne, and one of his three children survived the Freeze. In season 2, he works with Layton and his former subordinate Bess Till to maintain order in the wake of Wilford's return. He is one of Layton's leadership council alongside Ruth Wardell, Miss Audrey and Bennett Knox following Melanie's departure from the train. Near the end of season 2, he is placed in the Drawers on Big Alice along with his family. After Layton's return in season 3, he is rescued by Till and Dr. Pelton, but they discover that Anne had died at some point during their time in the Drawers. Roche subsequently struggles to deal with his grief and anger over Anne's death. Roche and his daughter choose to join the people going to New Eden at the end of the season.
 Annalise Basso as Lilah Jr. "LJ" Folger-Osweiller (season 1–3): The isolated teenage daughter of Lilah and Robert, she lives uptrain with her parents in First Class, surrounded by luxury. Appearing to be quiet and diligent, she is later revealed as a murderous psychopath and sadist, and the mastermind behind the serial murders on Snowpiercer committed by her bodyguard and boyfriend Erik Sotto. She is exposed by Layton, arrested and found guilty in a tribunal, but her acquittal on Melanie's order makes her one of the most hated First Class train passengers. Following the death of both of her parents in the revolution, the orphaned and defenseless LJ is evicted from First Class by Pike, and is now surviving in Third Class with Oz, both of them hated by the train's passengers. LJ reluctantly takes on a janitorial job and bonds with Alex Cavill. She eventually starts dating Oz. In season 3, she and Oz run the Night Car together and continue their relationship. In "The Last to Go," the two get married. In "The Original Sinners," after Oz leaves her for New Eden, LJ accidentally chokes to death on her father's glass eye.
 Jaylin Fletcher as Miles (season 1; recurring season 2–present): A Tailie child, whose parents and sister were left behind to die in the Freeze when their refugee group invaded the train, leaving him to be raised primarily by Andre and Josie - the rest of the Tail refer to him as "Miles and Miles" (implying no one is aware of his surname). Whip smart and talented, his brilliant intelligence wins him a coveted apprenticeship that allows him to move up the train to Second Class. He is later fast-track appointed an Engine Apprentice by Melanie. He plays a pivotal role in the revolution, revealing the truth about Melanie's deception to LJ Folger and working with Bennett, Melanie and Layton to kill the Folgers and their army by detaching seven cars from the train. In season 2, Miles is revealed to be working on engineering life systems and dreams of being one of the first people to recolonize the planet. In season 3, he visits with Josie, is revealed to have continued his apprenticeship and suggests the solution for settling the dispute between Layton and Pike. When the trains separate, Miles remains with Snowpiercer to continue training as an Engineer with Melanie and Bennett, resuming working in the Engine with them in the absence of Javi. Gabriel Jacob-Cross plays Young Miles.
Steven Ogg as Pike (seasons 2–3; recurring season 1): A Tailie, who was a career convict, serving time in Cook County Jail for armed robbery at the time of the Freeze, but escaped. He is respected as a hardened and battle-scarred leader in the Tail, and a warrior of his people, though he often acts as a renegade, out for whatever he can get and has shifting loyalties. In season 2, he starts an illicit trade between the two trains which Layton agrees to allow under his supervision. After assassinating Terence on Layton's orders, Pike suffers something of a breakdown out of guilt. In season 3, he assists Ruth Wardell in running the resistance on Snowpiercer in Layton's absence. After attempting to assassinate Layton, Pike is stabbed to death by him in a fight to the death in "Born to Bleed." He subsequently reappears as a priest in Layton's coma dream in "Ouroboros."
 Rowan Blanchard as Alexandra "Alex" Cavill (season 2–present; guest season 1): Melanie's daughter and Big Alice Engineer, who was  believed to have died in the Freeze when her mother was forced to leave her behind when Snowpiercer left Chicago seven years ago. In the season 1 finale, Alex returns aboard Big Alice. She spent seven years on Big Alice as Wilford's dedicated protégée. Wilford had also manipulated her into hating Melanie, her mother, by convincing her that Melanie "stole" the train and left her behind. Upon their reunification, Alex and her mother slowly began to rekindle their relationship. Alex also starts becoming friendly with LJ Folger despite their differing loyalties. Alex eventually abandons Wilford and joins Layton's pirate train. After reuniting with her mother in season 3, she decides to join Layton in going to New Eden rather than remaining on Snowpiercer with Melanie.
 Sean Bean as Joseph Wilford (season 2–present; uncredited season 1): An eccentric billionaire and genius inventor, Mr. Wilford is the powerful creator of Snowpiercer, worshipped as a Messiah-like figure who used his company, Wilford Industries, to refit his luxury liner train, "Wilford's Dreamliner" and its global railway into an ark, Snowpiercer, to save a small population from the Freeze (though in truth Melanie performed the engineering work to do so, and he claimed the credit). Initially believed to be the mysterious and reclusive Head Engineer of the train and is solely represented by Melanie, it is later revealed Melanie has assumed his identity and is the true Engineer; Wilford was believed to have died during the Freeze, after Melanie abandoned him to die at boarding, believing the remnants of humanity would not survive under his rule. This revelation led to a coup attempt by wealthy passengers from First Class, and a revolution by the Tail and Third Class sections. In the season 1 finale, after the revolution, Wilford returns in control of a secondary supply train, Big Alice, and docks with Snowpiercer. With his new technology and a master plan, Wilford intends to resume command of both trains. His first name is revealed to be Joseph in "A Great Odyssey". His (uncredited) voice is heard in a doctored recording in "Access Is Power".
 Chelsea Harris as Sykes (season 3; recurring season 2): Mr. Wilford's head of security aboard Big Alice, Sykes keeps her secrets and is loyal to Wilford. At the end of the second season, Sykes is captured by Bennett Knox and remains a prisoner onboard Layton's pirate train. In season 3, she has joined the crew, stating that she is doing her part as a prisoner of war. However, her loyalty to Wilford appears to be wavering and she is left to roam free by Layton after he retakes Snowpiercer. She later bonds with Javi over their mutual trauma from dealing with Wilford, revealing that her scars also come from an attack by Wilford's dog Jupiter. When the trains separate, Sykes joins Layton in going to New Eden.
 Archie Panjabi as Asha (season 3) A survivor discovered by Layton in a nuclear power plant in North Korea. In "Born to Bleed," Asha tells Pike that she's Indian and had lived in England. In "Setting Itself Right," she sacrifices herself to save Snowpiercer from a cloud of toxic volcanic gas.

Recurring
 Aaron Glenane as the Last Australian (seasons 1–2): A Tailie, and scrappy charmer from Perth with an intense desire to survive and have children because, as far as he knows, he is the last Australian. It's revealed that his real name is Murray, although no one calls him that. In season 2, Murray learns that he is not in fact the last Australian as there is another Australian aboard Big Alice, Emilia, who had also believed herself to be the last. In season 3, it's mentioned that he had died of influenza during the six months that Layton was away.
 Karin Konoval as Dr. Pelton: Snowpiercer physician who lives in Second Class, a friendly doctor who finds herself caught up in the politics and machinations aboard the train. She later supports Layton's revolution, hiding him and Josie and treating the wounded. In season 2, she remains one of Layton's most trusted supporters and is often seen representing Second Class in discussions. In season 3, she helps the revolution in Layton's absence as well as treating Layton's injuries and delivering his daughter Liana, leading her to clash with Mrs. Headwood over her unethical experiments. When the trains separate, she chooses to remain on Snowpiercer and is seen holding hands with Miss Gillies, suggesting a possible relationship between the two women.
 Aleks Paunovic as Bojan "Boki" Boscovic: The leader of Snowpiercer Breachmen, one of the most dangerous jobs on the train, he has a large and fearsome appearance; with frostbite scars and stumped ears, but is upbeat and jokes about the cold and the hazards of the job. His loyalty to Mr. Wilford becomes a problem for Layton and his fragile democracy after his return. Boki reveals that he has been working for Wilford since he was fourteen years old and has a hard time believing Wilford would betray his trust, even after the other Breachmen are murdered. After repairing Wilford's sabotage to the train, seeing Wilford's betrayal with his own eyes, he defects to Layton's side completely. He is apparently killed in the second season finale when the Aquarium Car is destroyed. At the end of the third season, he's revealed to have survived the explosion and has been nursed back to health by Mrs. Headwood as Wilford's new cold man with the added effect that he is now impervious to pain. However, he appears to be mute and brainwashed into serving Wilford again. When the trains separate, both Boki and Mrs. Headwood join Big Alice in going to New Eden.
 Happy Anderson as Dr. Henry Klimpt (season 1): A research scientist-turned-doctor living in Second Class. He oversees those unfortunate enough to be sentenced to the coffin-like Drawers. He later supports Layton's revolution.
 Timothy V. Murphy as Nolan Grey (season 1; guest season 2): The commander of Snowpiercer Jackboots security force, he is a brilliant tactician and a hardened Special Forces leader, who commanded men in the British SAS before the Freeze. He relishes keeping things in order and getting his hands dirty in combat. He is presumed dead after the penultimate episode of season 1 when Layton, Melanie, Bennett and Miles cut seven cars loose. In the second season, he reappears in flashbacks to the night the train was boarded.
 Kerry O'Malley as Lilah Folger, Sr. (season 1): A First Class passenger who knew Mr. Wilford before the Freeze, and a former corporate lawyer from old money, who is fiercely protective of her own, particularly her daughter LJ and the rest of First Class, with whom she shares a vested interest in maintaining their security and privilege. Matriarch of one of First’s leading families, she regularly makes complaints to Hospitality about things like etiquette in the sauna, and questions Melaine’s authority when things don’t go her way, though won’t go so far as to challenge Wilford himself. When it is discovered Wilford is not aboard, Lilah is amongst those who position themselves to lead the new regime governing the train. She, along with her husband, are both presumed dead after the penultimate episode of season 1 when Layton, Melanie, Bennett and Miles cut seven cars loose.
 Vincent Gale as Robert Folger (season 1): A First Class passenger who knew Mr. Wilford before the Freeze, who is convinced that First Class is essential for the wellbeing of Snowpiercer, and that Third Class and the Tail Section are dispensable. He takes advantage of the revelation of Melanie's impersonation of Wilford to lead a coup attempt to remove her from her position, an act leading to Leyton's revolution. He, along with his wife, are both killed in the penultimate episode of season 1 when Layton, Melanie, Bennett and Miles cut seven cars loose. Robert has a glass eye stemming from his daughter poking out his real eye during a temper tantrum which LJ accidentally chokes to death on at the end of season 3.
 Jonathan Lloyd Walker as Big John (season 1): A Tailie who works in Sanitation along with others from the Tail; work that is harsh slave-like labor. He is killed in the revolution.
 Brent Stait as Jakes Carter: A Tunnelman in Snowpiercer undercarriage.
 Shaun Toub as Terence (seasons 1–2): The head janitor aboard Snowpiercer who lives in Third Class, he is a charming, conniving, and ultimately dangerous janitor-turned-gangster who rules the Black Market with an enigmatic power, inspiring fierce loyalty in his army of minions. He is killed by Pike under Layton's orders for threatening Josie's safety.
 Fiona Vroom as Mary-Elizabeth Gillies: A primary teacher aboard Snowpiercer who lives in Second Class, she is an encouraging and well-rounded school teacher who is responsible for educating Snowpiercer next generation. A juror on the LJ Folger tribunal, she later supports Layton's revolution. She chooses to remain onboard Snowpiercer when the trains separate and she is seen holding hands with Dr. Pelton, suggesting a possible relationship between the two women.
 Kwasi Thomas as Z-Wreck: A Tailie who is imprisoned in the Drawers following the failed revolution. He is later rescued by the Last Australian and comes to Layton and Roche's rescue along with Strong Boy. In season 3, he is shown to be running a speakeasy in the Third Class market.
 Miranda Edwards as Lights: A Tailie and electronics expert. Following the revolution, she runs her own shop in the markets which is seen several times in season 3.
 Kurt Ostlund as Strong Boy (seasons 1–3): A Tailie, a mute young man who takes part in the failed revolution. As a result, he is locked in the Drawers. Strong Boy is later rescued by the Last Australian, and inexplicably can speak Mandarin upon revival. He aids Layton against Commander Grey in the revolution and survives to enjoy the benefits. In season 2, he begins regaining the ability to speak English. In season 3, six months later, he has regained the ability to speak English completely and serves in Ruth's resistance. He is tortured to death by Kevin McMahon in "The First Blow" but he reappears in the form of Pike's nightmare in "Born to Bleed."
 Emma Oliver as Winnipeg "Winnie": A Tailie child, the daughter of Suzanne and the sister of Patterson. Winnie takes part in the failed revolution by using a severed hand to open a door, resulting in her mother being punished by having her whole arm frozen off. Winnie ends up losing both her mother and brother as a result of the revolutions. In season 2, she has been adopted by Lights and often helps by running messages and other small tasks for Layton, something that she continues doing during Layton's absence in season 3. It's mentioned in the third season that she was born on the train and that she was named after the closest city as part of a Tailie naming tradition.
 Bryan Terrell Clark as Pastor Logan (season 2): A priest on Snowpiercer who counsels Bess Till over her struggles following the revolution. He is eventually revealed to be a Wilford supporter and his mole on Snowpiercer. After being exposed, Pastor Logan commits suicide by purposefully exposing his head to the outside air.
 Tom Lipinski as Kevin McMahon (seasons 2–3): Big Alice Head of Hospitality, and his loyalty to Mr. Wilford knows no bounds. Briefly captured and held as a POW by Layton and the rebels after being captured during a failed raid on Big Alice, he is released in exchange for Melanie, and is apparently compelled by Wilford to commit suicide as an act of loyalty after giving up information on Big Alice crew. It's later revealed that he's actually still alive. After Layton retakes the train, he is stabbed to death by LJ Folger for his murder of Strong Boy so that she can be on the winning side of the revolution.
 Damian Young as Mr. Headwood (season 2): An eccentric scientist on Big Alice alongside his wife, working on illicit experiments regarding the Freeze. In "The Last to Go," he is mentioned to have died of influenza.
 Sakina Jaffrey as Mrs. Headwood (season 2–present): An eccentric scientist on Big Alice alongside her husband, and often debates with him about Mr. Wilford's agenda as they work on secret experiments on his behalf. After Wilford's defeat in season 3, she continues her work, but she clashes on several occasions with Layton and Dr. Pelton over her experiments upon Layton's unborn daughter Liana. Alongside Boki, she accompanies Big Alice to New Eden at the end of the third season.
 Andre Tricoteux as Icy Bob (season 2): A hulking brute aboard Big Alice, Icy Bob is Mr. Wilford's greatest and most fearsome weapon. However, he does not appear to be unsympathetic to Snowpiercer's plight, keeping quiet about Josie's spying. After sabotaging Snowpiercer's water intakes in "The Eternal Engineer," Icy Bob suffers injuries from the cold beyond even his ability to survive and he dies.
 Georgina Haig as Emilia (season 2): A seamstress and Alex's friend aboard Big Alice, Emilia is Australian-native of Perth who thought she was the only Australian until she met Murray on Snowpiercer. In season 3, it's mentioned that she had died of influenza during the six months that Layton was away.
 Esther Ming Li as Carly Roche (season 2–present): Sam and Anne's teenage daughter who later befriends Alex. Alongside her father, she accompanies Layton to New Eden at the end of the third season.

Guest
 Manoj Sood as Rajiv Sharma (seasons 1,2): A First Class passenger and chair of their committee (though he has no real authority).
 Ian Collins as Tristan: A First Class passenger and Ruth's assistant. After Ruth joins the journey to New Eden in season 3, he becomes the new Head of Hospitality.
 Renée Victor as Mama Grandé (seasons 1–2): A Tailie who speaks almost no English, and is Santiago's grandmother. She survives her grandson's death in the revolution, and chooses to remain in the Tail. In season 3, it's mentioned that she had died of influenza during the six months that Layton was away.
 Michel Issa Rubio as Santiago (season 1): A Tailie, Mama Grandé's grandson and one of Layton's friends. He dies in the penultimate episode of season 1 when Layton, Melanie, Bennett and Miles cut seven cars loose; Layton not having enough time to rescue his imprisoned friends.
 Tom Kirk as Clay (season 1): A Third Class passenger and bartender working in the Nightcar beside Audrey and Zarah. He dies in the penultimate episode of season 1 when Layton, Melanie, Bennett and Miles cut seven cars loose; Layton not having enough time to rescue his imprisoned friends.
 Stephen Lobo as Martin Colvin (season 1, 3): A First Class passenger who warns Melanie about the Folgers' planned revolution. He later supports Layton's revolution, by secretly providing them with a gun, as Martin does not want the Folgers or Commander Grey to take over the train. In season 3, he is a part of the crew of the pirate train, having inadvertently stowed away aboard. He later betrays Layton and the others onboard, but is seemingly killed after Bess hits him over the head as he is not seen again afterwards.
 Yee Jee Tso as York Lam (seasons 1–2): A First Class passenger and Martin's husband.
 Dylan Schmid as Patterson (season 1): A Tailie young man, Suzanne's son and Winnie's older brother. After the failed revolution, his mother gets her arm frozen off and ultimately dies of infection, leaving Patterson to lead the family. He dies in the Nightcar battle in Layton's revolution.
 William Stanford Davis as Mr. Riggs (season 1): A Tailie and devout religious man, and one of Layton's friends. He dies in the penultimate episode of season 1 when Layton, Melanie, Bennett and Miles cut seven cars loose; Layton not having enough time to rescue his imprisoned friends.
 Madeleine Arthur as Nicolette "Nikki" Genêt (season 1): A Third Class passenger who was believed to be behind the first Snowpiercer murder and was locked in the Drawers as a result. With the new round of murders, she is released as a witness, but remains in a catatonic state. She is later murdered by Erik Sotto, but she appears in one of Layton's nightmares while Layton is in the Drawers.
 Ellie Harvie as The Notary: A woman whose job is to oversee the recording of all events on Snowpiercer. As part of this job, she oversees the executions of captured revolutionaries, but apparently aids Jinju's plan to rescue Melanie by buying her and Javi time to get Melanie out.
 Amanda Brugel as Eugenia (seasons 1–2): A First Class passenger who initially invested $400 million to build Snowpiercer. She is later one of the assassins who murders the Breachmen. After taking control of Snowpiercer, Wilford executes Eugenia and the other assassins by having them breathe in outside air.
 Sarah Strange as Suzanne (season 1): A Tailie and the mother of Patterson and Winnie, whose arm is frozen off as punishment for her daughter's role in the failed revolution. Despite her son and Josie's efforts, Suzanne later dies of an infection from her lost arm.
 Gary Hetherington as Walter Flemming (season 1): A Third Class passenger and papermaker aboard Snowpiercer. A juror on the LJ Folger tribunal, he later supports Layton's revolution and is executed for his actions.
 Jane McGregor as Astrid: A former Tailie who was able to move uptrain years before, as she was chosen for an apprenticeship. Now living in Third Class, and working in Snowpiercer Food Processing, she maintains her loyalty to the Tail, and aids in preparing for the revolution. In season 2, she is now assisting Dr. Pelton in treating the wounded after the revolution. In season 3, she acts as the head of food processing after Layton retakes the train and she joins the journey to New Eden.
 Matt Murray as Erik Sotto (season 1): A First Class private security officer and former Marine, who was hired to be the bodyguard of the Folger family during the Freeze. He is LJ's boyfriend, and acts as the muscle of the Snowpiercer serial killing team before being killed himself by Jackboots.
 Mark Margolis as Old Ivan (season 1): A Russian Tailie, the oldest person on Snowpiercer, Layton's mentor and a longstanding, respected member of the Tail. After celebrating his 84th birthday (possibly making him the oldest man left on Earth), he hangs himself, causing the Tail to revolt.
 Elaine Kao as Anne Roche (seasons 2–3): Sam's wife, who is ambivalent about supporting Layton, and considers supporting Wilford. She is later discovered to have died in the Drawers during her six months trapped there.

Episodes

Series overview

Season 1 (2020)

Season 2 (2021)

Season 3 (2022)

Production

Development 
In November 2015, Marty Adelstein's Tomorrow Studios optioned the rights to develop a television series based on the 2013 film Snowpiercer. The film had been adapted from the 1982 French graphic novel Le Transperceneige by Jacques Lob, Benjamin Legrand, and Jean-Marc Rochette. The film's director Bong Joon-ho was attached as an executive producer alongside Adelstein and Josh Friedman, with the latter also set to write. A year later in November 2016, the project was ordered to pilot along with backup scripts by TNT with Friedman to serve as showrunner. In May 2017, it was announced that Scott Derrickson would direct the pilot written by Friedman. The pilot was picked up to series in January 2018. Later that month, Friedman was removed from the project by TNT due to "creative differences" with the network. Graeme Manson was appointed to replace Friedman as showrunner the following month. That June, Derrickson refused to return for reshoots on the pilot due to creative disputes with Manson, explaining via Twitter:

Less than two weeks later, James Hawes joined the series in July as a co-executive producer and a director to oversee the reshoots for the pilot. According to Manson, nearly nothing of the original pilot's footage was used outside of one special-effect scene, and this reshooting was the primary cause for the year-long delay in the show's premiere. Later that month, Netflix picked up the international distribution rights to stream the series outside of the United States and China. In May 2019, it was announced that the series would air on TBS instead of TNT for a spring 2020 release, and that a second season had already been ordered by the network. That month, it was also announced that Huanxi Media Group had signed on to broadcast the first two seasons exclusively in China. Manson will return as showrunner for the second season. In September 2019, the decision to change networks was reversed, with the series once again set to air on TNT. On January 19, 2021, ahead of the second-season premiere, TNT renewed the series for a third season. On July 29, 2021, TNT renewed the series for a fourth season. On March 28, 2022, it was announced that Paul Zbyszewski is taking over as
the showrunner and added as an executive producer for the fourth season. Following the formation of new parent company Warner Bros. Discovery in April 2022, original scripted content development was cut at TNT and TBS and in June, it was announced that the fourth season will be its final season. On January 13, 2023, it was reported that the final season won't air on TNT, instead, it is being shopped alongside potential prequel and sequel.

Writing 
The series is designed to be a reboot of the original 2013 film's continuity. The story takes place seven years after a climate catastrophe rendered the outside world uninhabitable, forcing the remnants of humanity to live confined inside of a massive train that constantly circles the globe. The series investigates class struggle, as the passengers of the train are segregated by wealth. The series star Daveed Diggs said that the show would "broaden exponentially" the world established by the film and the 1982 graphic novel. "That's one of the advantages of TV, you have time" Diggs said, "so the politics that are hinted at in the film are explored in much more depth and the mechanism of the train [is explored further] — just the little things that create a world, world specificity". At the 2017 Television Critics Association press tour, TNT and TBS president Kevin Reilly revealed that the Snowpiercer series would be akin to a "space ship show" due to its contained setting and that it would feature a mystery during the first season.

Casting 
In May 2017, Daveed Diggs was cast as Andre Layton. The following month, Jennifer Connelly and Mickey Sumner landed the other lead roles of Melanie Cavill and Bess Till, respectively. Casting continued throughout the month of June with Annalise Basso as LJ Folger, Sasha Frolova as Pixi Aariak, Alison Wright as Ruth Wardell, Benjamin Haigh as Fergus McConnell, Roberto Urbina as Javi, and Katie McGuinness as Josie McConnell. That August, it was announced that Susan Park had joined the main cast as Jinju. In September, Lena Hall was cast as Sayori. The series order in January 2018 also revealed that Sheila Vand and Sam Otto had been cast in then-undisclosed roles as series regulars. Vand  was reported to be playing Zarah, while Otto will play John "Oz" Osweiler. In August 2018, Iddo Goldberg and Jaylin Fletcher were added as series regulars in the roles of Bennett and Miles, respectively.

Casting for a number of recurring roles were also announced during the month of August, including Steven Ogg as Pike, Timothy V. Murphy as Commander Grey, Happy Anderson as Klimpt, Jonathan Lloyd Walker as Big John, and Aleks Paunovic as Bojan Boscovic. The following month in September, Shaun Toub and Kerry O'Malley were added to the recurring cast as Terence and Lilah Folger, respectively. In October 2018, Aaron Glenane was cast as The Last Australian alongside Fiona Vroom as Miss Gillies, both in recurring capacities. In March 2019, Rowan Blanchard was cast as Alexandra for a guest role with the option of becoming a series regular should the series be renewed for a second season. Blanchard's promotion to the main cast for the second season was confirmed with the series' renewal that May. In June 2019, Ogg was also promoted to series regular status for the second season. In October 2019, Chelsea Harris was announced in the recurring role of Sykes. Later that month, it was also announced that Sean Bean would be a series regular for the second season. In November, Tom Lipinski was added to the second season's recurring cast as Kevin. In December 2019, Sakina Jaffrey and Damian Young joined the second season's recurring cast as Mrs. and Mr. Headwood, respectively. On February 16, 2021, Archie Panjabi was cast as a new series regular for the third season. On March 4, 2021, Chelsea Harris was promoted to as a series regular for the third season.
On March 28, 2022, Clark Gregg and Michael Aronov were cast in undisclosed capacities for the fourth season.

Filming 
In January 2017, it was reported that filming for the series was scheduled to begin in mid-March of that year. By September 25, pilot director Scott Derrickson indicated that production for the series had officially commenced. Reshoots for the pilot, overseen by new director James Hawes, began on August 20, 2018 in Vancouver, British Columbia and concluded on January 24, 2019. Principal photography for the second season began on October 21, 2019 in Langley, British Columbia and was originally expected to end on March 20, 2020. In March 2020, production was shut down due to the COVID-19 pandemic. Lena Hall, who portrays Miss Audrey, confirmed in July 2020 that the last block of episodes for season 2—episodes 9 and 10—were being filmed. As of March 11, 2021, filming for the third season was in progress until at least July 23, 2021. Filming for the fourth season began on March 28, 2022 and concluded on August 6, 2022.

Design
Despite the series' roots as a graphic novel and film, production designer Barry Robison was told to give the train "its own identity". He conceived the massive locomotive on a "very, very long piece of paper," drawing the entire train in "about three days." His Vancouver design team, headed by Production Designer Stephen Geaghan, then set out to construct around 20 of the 1,001 cars of various sizes over four soundstages, heeding to TNT's orders to not make the train look "too sci-fi". Construction on each of the cars with contrasting classes took less than six weeks and was met with approval from series producer and film director Bong Joon-ho.

Release

Broadcast 
The series debuted on TNT in the United States in the spring of 2020, while Netflix began to air the series globally outside of the United States and China. Huanxi Media Group is set to broadcast the first two seasons exclusively in China.

The series had originally been planned to premiere on May 31, 2020, yet was moved up to May 17, 2020 in early April. Brett Weitz, general manager for TNT, stated the earlier premiere was related to the COVID-19 pandemic in order to bring the series to viewers earlier. On October 8, 2020, at New York Comic Con, TNT announced the second season was set to premiere on January 25, 2021. The third season premiered on January 24, 2022.

Marketing 
Cast members Connelly, Diggs, Wright, Sumner, Hall, and Ogg attended the 2019 San Diego Comic-Con International along with executive producers Manson, Adelstein, and Clements to promote the series and debut its first official trailer. As part of the promotion for the upcoming series, insect protein bars mimicking those from the film were made available at the event.

Reception

Critical response
Review aggregator Rotten Tomatoes collected 82 critic reviews, identified 63% of them as positive, and reported an average rating of 6.5/10 for the first season. The website's critics consensus reads: "Snowpiercer takes a different route with its source material, crafting an ambitious sci-fi mystery with style to spare, but with little of the subversive bite of Bong Joon-ho's theatrical adaptation." Metacritic assigned the first season a weighted average score of 55 out of 100, based on 25 critics, indicating "mixed or average reviews".

For the second season, Rotten Tomatoes reported an approval rating of 88% based on 16 reviews, with an average rating of 7.1/10. The website's critics consensus states: "Snowpiercer second season picks up the momentum by dropping narrative baggage without losing its critical reflections on society." Metacritic gave the second season a weighted average score of 59 out of 100 based on 5 reviews, indicating "mixed or average reviews".

Ratings

Season 1

Season 2

Season 3

Awards and nominations

Notes

References

External links 
 
 
 

2020 American television series debuts
2022 American television series endings
2020s American LGBT-related drama television series
2020s American drama television series
2020s American science fiction television series
American thriller television series
CJ Entertainment
Disaster television series
Dystopian television series
English-language television shows
Fiction set in 2026
Live action television shows based on films
Post-apocalyptic television series
TNT (American TV network) original programming
Television productions suspended due to the COVID-19 pandemic
Television series based on French comics
Television series by Studio T
Television series set in 2021
Television series set in the 2020s
Television shows filmed in Vancouver
Works about social class
Works set on trains